This is a list of public art in St. Joseph County, Indiana.

This list applies only to works of public art accessible in an outdoor public space. For example, this does not include artwork visible inside a museum.  

Most of the works mentioned are sculptures. When this is not the case (i.e. sound installation, for example) it is stated next to the title.

Mishawaka

Notre Dame

Osceola

South Bend

References

Tourist attractions in St. Joseph County, Indiana
St. Joseph County